The U-Haul lesbian or  U-Haul syndrome is a stereotype of lesbian relationships referring to the idea that lesbians tend to move in together after a short period of time (e.g., after the second date). It suggests an extreme inclination toward committed relationships. Depending on context, the term can be considered humorous, complimentary, or pejorative.

Origin 
A joke which references U-Haul (a brand of rental "move-it-yourself" trucks and trailers) became well known in lesbian culture.
Question: What does a lesbian bring on a second date?
Answer: A U-Haul.

It is considered a staple of lesbian humor. Often attributed to comic Lea DeLaria, it is also possibly derived from Canadian lesbian advocate Krista Lush, who once noted of her relationships: "one kiss, and they move in."

Reference to a "U-Haul" later became a stereotype of sexual identity in the gay community. It is sometimes followed or preceded by a standard joke about gay men:
Question: What does a gay man bring on a second date?
Answer: What second date?

The joke is also popular outside the LGBT community.

Relationships 
Psychologists note that the U-Haul joke epitomizes the perceived phenomenon of lesbians to form intense emotional connections, referred to in gay slang as an "urge to merge". Critics of this alleged tendency suggest that it is used by lesbians to avoid the risks involved with dating. In their view, an aversion to the risks of dating is linked to a stunted development of intimate relationships during the teenage years when most gays and lesbians are in the closet. With the freedom of adulthood, lesbians become drawn to the "U-Haul" relationships, appreciating their intensity and intimacy.

Despite the U-Haul concept's positive suggestion that lesbians do not have difficulties committing to relationships, some psychologists also believe that this behavior can be unhealthy. They argue that the short dating span bypasses serious discussion on many relationship issues prior to moving in (such as sexual compatibility or future expectations) and this can manifest itself in various problems later on.

See also 

 Cohabitation
 Commitment bands
 Domestic partnership
 Gay bars
 Gay community
 Gay slang
 Lesbian bed death
 Queer studies
 Same-sex marriage

References 

Lesbian culture
Lesbian slang
Lesbianism
Slang
Stereotypes of LGBT people